Hank Landry may refer to:
Hank Landry (Stargate), a fictional character in Stargate SG-1
Hank Landry (Veronica Mars), a fictional character in Veronica Mars